Skender Loshi (born 12 February 1999) is a professional footballer, who plays as a forward for the Belgian club Dessel. Born in Netherlands, he has chosen to represent Albania at the international level.

Club career

SV TEC
On 3 December 2019, Loshi signed a six-month contract with Tweede Divisie club SV TEC and received squad number 24. On 11 January 2020, he made his debut in a 2–2 away draw against ASWH after being named in the starting line-up. He was not fielded again. Seventeen days after debut, SV TEC through a communiqué stated that after a mutual agreement they decided to end the cooperation.

Feronikeli
On 29 January 2020, Loshi and his brother Simon joined with Football Superleague of Kosovo club Feronikeli, and received squad number 19. He did not play any games at Feronikeli.

Stomil Olsztyn
On 22 February 2020, Loshi signed a one-season contract with Polish I liga club Stomil Olsztyn and received squad number 19. On 11 July 2020, he made his debut in a 1–2 home defeat against Miedź Legnica after coming on as a substitute at 82nd minute in place of Sam van Huffel.

San Ġwann
On 11 September 2021, Loshi made his debut with Maltese Challenge League club San Ġwann against St. George's after being named in the starting line-up and scored his side's two goals during a 4–0 home win. Five days after debut, he officially joined the club.

ASWH
On 7 February 2022, Loshi and his brother Simon joined the Dutch Tweede Divisie side ASWH. Five days later, he made his ASWH debut in his team's 3–1 home win against GVVV. After being named in the starting line-up, fourteen minutes into the game, he made an assist for Daniël Wissel's first of three goals. On 5 March 2022, Loshi scored for the first and last time for ASWH, in the 69th minute against Jong Sparta in an away game that ASWH won 1–2. Before the season ended, the Loshis and ASWH separated.

Dessel Sport 
Since the summer of 2022, Skender Loshi plays at Dessel in Belgium.

International career
On 9 November 2018, Loshi received a call-up from Albania U21 for the friendly matches against Malta U21. He was an unused substitute in those matches.

References

External links

1999 births
Living people
Footballers from Breda
Albanian footballers
Albanian expatriate footballers
Albanian expatriate sportspeople in Kosovo
Albanian expatriate sportspeople in Poland
Albanian expatriate sportspeople in Malta
Dutch footballers
Dutch expatriate footballers
Dutch expatriate sportspeople in Poland
Dutch expatriate sportspeople in Malta
Kosovan footballers
Kosovan expatriate footballers
Kosovan expatriate sportspeople in Poland
Association football forwards
Tweede Divisie players
SV TEC players
Football Superleague of Kosovo players
KF Feronikeli players
I liga players
OKS Stomil Olsztyn players
Maltese Challenge League players
San Gwann F.C. players
Tweede Divisie
ASWH players